Acetomicrobium flavidum is a thermophilic bacterium in the genus Acetomicrobium. The bacterium is gram negative and highly motile. The species represented around 25% of the microbial population in the sludge.

References

Synergistota
Bacteria described in 1985